USS Adept (AFD-23) was a AFDL-1-class small auxiliary dry dock of the United States Navy Auxiliary floating drydock built for World War II.

Construction and career 
The construction of one-section, steel, floating Drydock built at Jacksonville, Florida by George D. Auchter Co. and had begun late in 1943 and completed in December 1944. The small, non-self-propelled auxiliary floating drydock was then towed to the Chesapeake Bay for duty at the United States Coast Guard base at Curtis Bay, Baltimore., where she began docking small naval combatant ships—up to the size of destroyer escorts—for hull repairs.

Redesignated AFDL-23 on 1 August 1946, she was moved to Hawaii in the 18 months immediately following the end of the war. By 1 January 1947, AFDL-23 was laid up with the Pacific Reserve Fleet at Pearl Harbor.

After almost two decades of inactivity, AFDL-23 was placed in service in December 1965 to support the Navy's efforts in South Vietnam during the Vietnam War. She served at the Pacific Fleet's advanced bases. While continuing such duty, AFDL-23 was named Adept on 7 June 1979.

On 24 February 1992, USS Brunswick (ATS-3) towed Adept out of Subic Bay for Guam. In the fall of 2004, USS Osprey (MHC-51) made another visit to Adept at Gulf Copper Ship Repair, Aransas Pass, from 1 until 5 October. In 2019, she began her upgrade in Dock 4.

Awards 

 American Campaign Medal
 Asiatic–Pacific Campaign Medal 
 World War II Victory Medal 
 National Defense Service Medal

References

NavSource Online: Service Ship Photo Archive Adept (AFDL-23) ex AFDL-23 (1946–1979) AFD-23 (1943–1946)

1944 ships
Ships built in Jacksonville, Florida
Floating drydocks of the United States Navy